Barat Academy is an independent college preparatory school, in Chesterfield, Missouri for grades 6–12. It was founded in 2007 in the traditions of the Sacred Heart. It is the first co-educational completely independent Catholic high school in the state of Missouri.  Barat Academy is the only private, independent, Catholic high school in St. Louis that offers single gender classes on a co-ed campus. The Barat Academy experience includes a strong faith-based environment, a college preparatory curriculum, and a firm commitment to service. Barat Academy's mascot is an eagle and its colors are red and white. 

School ranking and review site, Niche.com, gives Barat Academy an "A" overall ranking. It placed Barat Academy as the No. 20 best college prep private high school out of 92 schools in the State of Missouri. In addition, Barat Academy ranked No. 11 out of 162 schools for most diverse private high schools in Missouri.  

The school has a history of financial troubles, and was sued for eviction in 2022.

School Mission and Vision 
As a private, independent, Catholic, college preparatory school, Barat Academy recognizes both the worth of each student's intellect and the importance of fostering caring citizens who will become lifelong learners. Barat Academy strives to become a place where boys and girls become young men and women of integrity, with a strong sense of social justice, prepared for college and prepared to lead.

History 
Barat Academy opened to a class of freshmen in 2007, added tenth, eleventh, and twelfth grades over the following three years, and graduated its first class in May 2011. It is founded in the traditions of the Sacred Heart. The school was named after Madeleine Sophie Barat, founder of the Society of the Sacred Heart. An anonymous gift of about $1.65 million in 2007 covered tuition for the school’s inaugural class of 150 students.

Barat Academy was first located in Dardenne Prairie when it opened its doors in 2007, but relocated to Chesterfield, Missouri in 2011 when the bank that held its mortgage collapsed in the aftermath of the 2008 economic crisis. Moving to a neighboring county caused a steep drop in enrollment contributed to the school's financial issues. During the 2009-2010 school year, Barat had 181 students in grades 9 through 11. That increased to 250 students for the 2010-2011 school year as Barat added a 12th grade. The cross-county move cost Barat Academy about 40 students.

Barat Academy’s first graduating class was 2011. 549 students have since graduated from the school, including 81 International Students from China, Italy, Mexico, South Korea, Vietnam, and Ukraine. Barat Academy's graduates went to enroll in over 250 colleges and universities in Australia, Canada, the United Kingdom, and the United States. Barat Academy graduated received over $3,000,000/year in college scholarships. In its short history, Barat Academy also produced 4 National Merit Finalists, 3 Commended – representing the top 1% of students in high school in America.

Academics 
As a college preparatory school, Barat Academy's mission is to ensure each of its student graduates fully prepared for the rigors of the most demanding college setting. Moreover, Barat Academy aims to instill in each of its students a strong sense of community and a passion for learning that will last a lifetime. Several Barat Academy teachers were among recipients of the prestigious The Excellence in Teaching Awards sponsored annually by Emerson, the St. Louis-headquartered global technology and engineering company. Barat Academy's academics feature the following:

Curriculum 
In addition to courses in traditional college preparatory curriculum, Barat Academy provides students with a number of choices in electives. Students can also take a number of AP courses and advanced college credit course through collaboration with universities. Currently, Barat Academy offers the following AP courses: 

AP Biology
AP Calculus AB
AP Calculus BC
AP U.S. Government
AP Human Geography
AP Literature & Composition
AP Microeconomics
AP Macroeconomics
AP Music Theory
AP Physics
AP Psychology
AP Spanish
AP Statistics

Single gender classes 
Studies are now showing students perform better academically in single gender classes. The single gender classroom lends itself to a greater learning environment where students feel more comfortable and participate much more than in conventional classrooms.

Small classes 

The student-teacher relationship is another critical component of academic success. By keeping its class sizes small, Barat Academy ensures each of its student receives the time and attention necessary to build an effective student-teacher relationship.

Technology 
The use of modern information technology is essential to a 21st century education. Using a variety of software and web applications, Barat Academy students make extensive use of their laptops in and out of the classroom.

Peace Project 
The senior service learning project at Barat Academy, known as the Peace Project, allows students to focus on a social issue of interest; research the local, national, and global implication of that issue; design and implement a project to address the causes and effects of that issue; and collaborate with a group of peers who share their passion for that issue.  The group’s work, both individual and collaborative, culminates in completion of their project proposal and a formal research-based presentation to students, faculty, parents, and community members. 

Through reflection and discernment, students will identify the needs of their neighbors.  Students will build upon the essential academic skills they have developed during their high school experience to study the contributing factors to those needs.  All five goals of Sacred Heart schools come together for the students.  The students will find in this project an opportunity to grow intellectually, interpersonally, and spiritually.

Service Learning  
The Service Learning program is an integral part of the curriculum at Barat Academy. Student's academic classes intersect with Service Learning, through what they read in English, experiment and study in science, and discuss in social studies and theology. The Service Learning Program is designed to instill in Barat students an appreciation for the world and a sense of our responsibility to preserve it.

Each grade level has its own theme: freshmen focus on "Environmental Awareness and Ecological Stewardship," sophomores focus on "Nurturing our Youthful Neighbors," and juniors focus on "Assisting Area Adults." Seniors, through their "Peace Project," choose to delve deeper into an issue in which they are most passionate. 

Nyomi Sankar, currently a sophomore at Barat Academy, provided a good example of the power of service learning through her brave volunteering and service to others. In May 2022, Nyomi travelled to Przemysl, Poland, and lived with the Little Servant Sisters where she, her mom and younger sister worked on the “front lines” with women and children who were temporarily housed with the Little Servant Sisters after crossing the Ukraine border. Her story was featured on NBC station in St. Louis.

Athletics 
 In 2013, the Barat Academy Boys Golf Team won the Missouri Class 1 Boys Golf State Championship. Team members Trevor Cronin and Sean Weber finished #1 and #2 in the individual results.
 In 2014, the Barat Academy Boys Golf Team won the Missouri Class 1 Boys Golf State Championship for the second subsequent year.

Notes and references

External links
 Official website

Roman Catholic secondary schools in St. Louis County, Missouri
Educational institutions established in 2007
Roman Catholic Archdiocese of St. Louis
2007 establishments in Missouri
Buildings and structures in St. Louis County, Missouri